The Easter Bunny (also called the Easter Rabbit or Easter Hare) is a folkloric figure and symbol of Easter, depicted as a rabbit—sometimes dressed with clothes—bringing Easter eggs. Originating among German Lutherans, the "Easter Hare" originally played the role of a judge, evaluating whether children were good or disobedient in behavior at the start of the season of Eastertide, similar to the "naughty or nice" list made by Santa Claus. As part of the legend, the creature carries colored eggs in its basket, as well as candy, and sometimes toys, to the homes of children. As such, the Easter Bunny again shows similarities to Santa (or the Christkind) and Christmas by bringing gifts to children on the night before a holiday. The custom was first mentioned in Georg Franck von Franckenau's De ovis paschalibus ('About Easter eggs') in 1682, referring to a German tradition of an Easter Hare bringing eggs for the children.

Symbols

Rabbits and hares

The hare was a popular motif in medieval church art.  In ancient times, it was widely believed (as by Pliny, Plutarch, Philostratus, and Aelian) that the hare was a hermaphrodite.  The idea that a hare could reproduce without loss of virginity led to an association with the Virgin Mary, with hares sometimes occurring in illuminated manuscripts and Northern European paintings of the Virgin and Christ Child.  It may also have been associated with the Holy Trinity, as in the three hares motif.

Eggs

Eggs have been used as fertility symbols since antiquity. Eggs became a symbol in Christianity associated with rebirth as early as the 1st century AD, via the iconography of the Phoenix egg, and they became associated with Easter specifically in medieval Europe, when eating them was prohibited during the fast of Lent. A common practice in England at that time was for children to go door-to-door begging for eggs on the Saturday before Lent began. People handed out eggs as special treats for children prior to their fast. 

As a special dish, eggs would probably have been decorated as part of the Easter celebrations. Later, German Protestants retained the custom of eating colored eggs for Easter, though they did not continue the tradition of fasting. Eggs boiled with some flowers change their color, bringing the spring into the homes, and some over time added the custom of decorating the eggs. Many Christians of the Eastern Orthodox Church to this day typically dye their Easter eggs red, the color of blood, in recognition of the blood of the sacrificed Christ (and, of the renewal of life in springtime). Some also use the color green, in honor of the new foliage emerging after the long-dead time of winter. The Ukrainian art of decorating eggs for Easter, known as pysanky, dates to ancient, pre-Christian times. Similar variants of this form of artwork are seen amongst other eastern and central European cultures.

The idea of an egg-giving hare went to the U.S. in the 18th century. Protestant German immigrants in the Pennsylvania Dutch area told their children about the Osterhase (sometimes spelled Oschter Haws). Hase means "hare", not rabbit, and in Northwest European folklore the "Easter Bunny" indeed is a hare. According to the legend, only good children received gifts of colored eggs in the nests that they made in their caps and bonnets before Easter.

Gallery

Alleged association with Ēostre
In a publication from 1874 German philologist Adolf Holtzmann stated "The Easter Hare is unintelligible to me, but probably the hare was the sacred animal of Ostara". The connection between Easter and that goddess had been made by Jacob Grimm in his 1835 Deutsche Mythologie. This proposed association was repeated by other authors including Charles Isaac Elton and Charles J. Billson. In 1961 Christina Hole wrote, "The hare was the sacred beast of Eastre (or Ēostre), a Saxon goddess of Spring and of the dawn." The belief that Ēostre had a hare companion who became the Easter Bunny was popularized when it was presented as fact in the BBC documentary Shadow of the Hare (1993).

The Oxford Dictionary of English Folklore however states "... there is no shred of evidence" that hares were sacred to Ēostre, noting that Bede does not associate her with any animal.

See also
Easter
 Domestic and pet rabbits
 Easter Bilby
 Mad as a March hare
 Rabbits and hares in art
 Rabbits in culture and literature
 "The Goose That Laid the Golden Eggs"

References

External links

 Charles J. Billson. "The Easter Hare". Folk-Lore. Vol. 3, No. 4 (December 1892).
 On the Bunny Trail: In Search of the Easter Bunny, Stephen Winick, Folklife Today, March 22, 2016
  (Easter Fox) (in German)
 Bott, Adrian (2011) The modern myth of the Easter bunny, The Guardian, Sat 23 Apr 2011

 
1682 introductions
Advertising characters
Christian folklore
Easter traditions
German folklore
Easter traditions in Germany
Holiday characters
Fictional rabbits and hares
Fictional characters introduced in the 1680s